The 2021 McDonald's All-American Boys Game was an all-star basketball game that was scheduled be held in 2021. The game's rosters featured the best and most highly recruited high school boys graduating in the class of 2021. The game would have been the 44th annual version of the McDonald's All-American Game first played in 1977. Due to the impact of the COVID-19 pandemic, the game was cancelled.
The 24 players were selected from over 700 nominees by a committee of basketball experts. They were chosen not only for their on-court skills, but for their performances off the court as well.

Rosters
When the rosters were announced on February 23, 2021, Michigan had the most selections with three, while Duke and Kentucky had two. At the announcement of roster selections, only 14 schools were represented and 6 players were uncommitted.

Team East

Team West

^undecided at the time of roster selection
Reference

References

McDonald's All-American Boys Game
McDonald's All-American